Atipara is a village in Barisal District in the Barisal Division of southern-central Bangladesh. Population around 1500. The village locate 25 Kilometres north of Barishal City.

References

External links
 Satellite map at Maplandia.com

Populated places in Barisal District